Ankyrin repeat domain-containing protein 17 is a protein that in humans is encoded by the ANKRD17 gene.

This gene encodes a protein with ankyrin repeats, which are associated with protein-protein interactions. Studies in mice suggest that this protein is involved in liver development. Two transcript variants encoding different isoforms have been found for this gene.

References

External links

Further reading